Paul Edward "Spider" Gibson (August 25, 1924 – August 11, 1999) was an American football player who played at the end, quarterback, and defensive end positions. He played college football for NC State and professional football for the Buffalo Bills, Ottawa Rough Riders, and Hamilton Tiger-Cats.

Early years
Gibson was born in 1924 in Winston-Salem, North Carolina. He attended and played football at Mineral Springs High School in Mineral Springs, North Carolina.

College football and military service
Gibson played college football for NC State from 1943 to 1946. He also served in the United States Army.

Professional football
He was selected by the Pittsburgh Steelers in the 1947 NFL Draft and by the Buffalo Bills in the 1947 AAFC Draft.  He played in the All-America Football Conference (AAFC) for the Bills for three seasons from 1947 to 1949. He appeared in 30 AAFC games and caught 22 passes for 402 yards while also intercepting a pass on defense. He also played in the Canadian Football League (CFL) for the Ottawa Rough Riders in 1950 and for the Hamilton Tiger-Cats in 1951. He appeared in 23 CFL games.

Family and later years
Gibson died in 1999 at age 74 in Charleston, South Carolina.

References

1924 births
1999 deaths
Buffalo Bills (AAFC) players
San Francisco 49ers (AAFC) players
Ottawa Rough Riders players
Hamilton Tiger-Cats players
NC State Wolfpack football players
Players of American football from Winston-Salem, North Carolina
American football ends
United States Army personnel of World War II